Year 1403 (MCDIII) was a common year starting on Monday (link will display the full calendar) of the Julian calendar.

Events 
 January–December 
 January / February – Treaty of Gallipoli: Süleyman Çelebi makes wide-ranging concessions to the Byzantine Empire and other Christian powers, in the southern Balkans.
 February 7 – King Henry IV of England marries as his second wife Joan of Navarre, the daughter of King Charles II of Navarre and widow of John IV, Duke of Brittany, at Winchester Cathedral.
 March 12 – As King Martin I of Aragon helps to end the siege by the French of the papal palace in Avignon, Antipope Benedict XIII flees to Aragon.
 March 23 – Stříbrná Skalice in Central Bohemia is razed by Sigismund of Luxembourg.
 April – Balša III succeeds his father Đurađ II as ruler of the Principality of Zeta (now the Republic of Montenegro).
 May 21 – Ruy Gonzalez de Clavijo, an ambassador from the king of Castile to Timur, leaves Cadiz; he arrives in Samarkand over a year later.
 Before July 21 – Henry 'Hotspur' Percy forms an alliance with Welsh rebel Owain Glyndŵr.
 July 21 – Battle of Shrewsbury:  King Henry IV of England defeats a rebel army led by "Hotspur" Percy, who is killed in the battle.
 October 7 – Battle of Modon: The Genoese fleet under Jean Le Maingre (Marshal Boucicaut) is defeated by the Republic of Venice, at Modon in the Peloponnese.
 October – An English fleet organised by John Hawley of Dartmouth and Thomas Norton of Bristol seizes seven French merchant vessels in the English Channel.
 November – An English revenge raid on Brittany by Sir William Wilford captures 40 ships and causes considerable damage ashore.
 December – Local English forces defeat an attempted French raid on the Isle of Wight under Waleran III, Count of Ligny.

 Date unknown 
 Jan Hus begins preaching Wycliffite ideas in Bohemia.
 In China, the Yongle Emperor of the Ming dynasty
 moves the capital from Nanjing to Beijing.
 commissions the Yongle Encyclopedia, one of the world's earliest and largest known general encyclopedias.
 orders his coastal provinces to build a vast fleet of ships, with construction centered at Longjiang near Nanjing; the inland provinces are to provide wood and float it down the Yangtze River.
 The Temple of a City God is constructed in Shanghai.
 The Gur-e Amir Mausoleum is built in Samarkand by Timur, after the death of his grandson Muhammad Sultan, and eventually becomes the family mausoleum of the Timurid dynasty.
 Georgia makes peace with Timur, but has to recognise him as a suzerain and pay him tribute.
 The world's first quarantine station is built in Venice, to protect against the Black Death.
 Grand Duke Vytautas ends his alliance with Muscovy, and captures Vyazma and Smolensk.
 Stefan Lazarević establishes Belgrade, as the capital of the Serbian Despotate.
 A guild of stationers is founded in the City of London. As the Worshipful Company of Stationers and Newspaper Makers (the "Stationers' Company"), it continues to be a livery company in the 21st century.
 In Ireland
 Tadgh Ruadh mac Maelsechlainn O Cellaigh succeeds Conchobar an Abaidh mac Maelsechlainn O Cellaigh, as King of Hy-Many, in present-day Galway and Roscommon.
 Maolmhordha mac Con Connacht succeeds Giolla Iosa mac Pilib, as King of East Breifne, in present-day Leitrim and Cavan.
 probable – Ououso becomes King of Nanzan, in present-day south Okinawa, Japan.

Births 
 January 2 – Basilios Bessarion, Latin Patriarch of Constantinople (d. 1472)
 February 22 – King Charles VII of France, monarch of the House of Valois, King of France from 1422 to his death (d. 1461)
 June 11 – John IV, Duke of Brabant, son of Antoine (d. 1427)
 August 11 – Ravenna Petrova, Princess of Amara Palace, daughter of William Hamilton and Anita Petrova. (d. 1423)
 September 1 – Louis VIII, Duke of Bavaria, German noble (d. 1445)
 September 25 – Louis III of Anjou (d. 1434)
 September 29 – Elisabeth of Brandenburg, Duchess of Brzeg-Legnica and Cieszyn, German princess (d. 1449)
 date unknown
 Robert Wingfield, English politician (d. 1454)
 John IV, Emperor of Trebizond (d. 1459)

Deaths 
 March 8 – Beyazid, Ottoman Sultan (b. 1354)
 April 27 – Maria of Bosnia, Countess of Helfenstein (b. 1335)
 April – Đurađ II Stracimirović, Serbian nobleman from the House of Balšić in Zeta
 May 10 – Katherine Swynford, Duchess of Lancaster, spouse of John of Gaunt
 May 12 – William de Lode, English prior
 July 21 (at the Battle of Shrewsbury) 
Sir Walter Blount, English soldier, standard-bearer of Henry IV (in battle)
Edmund Stafford, 5th Earl of Stafford, English soldier (in battle)
Henry 'Hotspur' Percy, English rebel (in battle)
 July 23 – Thomas Percy, 1st Earl of Worcester, English rebel (executed) (b. 1343)
 date unknown – Vukosav Nikolić, Bosnian nobleman (in battle)
 probable date – Hajji Zayn al-Attar, Persian physician

References